Bauernfeind (variant Bauerfeind) is a German surname. It originates as a byname, literally "peasants' enemy", in the late medieval period, before that (12th century) a comparable Geburenhasz is on record. The form Geburnvint is found in the poem Der Renner as a generic byname of "villains". Historical spelling variants include Pawrnfeynt, Pawrveint, Gebure vient. Specific individuals with the byname are on record in the 15th century, so  Heintz von Redwitz. Later, the byname was generically applied to men-at-arms or Landsknechte who chastised the peasant population in the service of a feudal lord. The gradual development into a surname takes place in the course of the 16th century.
The name has survived into the contemporary period, with currently (as of 2013) 748 entries in the German phonebook, the greatest concentration of people with the name found in Bavaria, and 398 entries for the variant Bauerfeind, with a concentration in North Rhine-Westphalia.

People with the surname:
Albert Bauernfeind (1953–2018), catholic clergyman
Andre Pauernfeindt (fl. 1510s)
Bruno Bauerfeind, founder of the Bauerfeind AG health care equipment company of Thuringia (founded 1929)
, German basketball player
 (born 1972), Austrian composer and painter
Franz Joseph von Bauernfeind (1901–1944), Austrian journalist
 (1728-1763), German draftsman and engraver
Gustav Bauernfeind (1848–1904)
 (1908-1985), Austrian composer, organist, choirmaster and music teacher
Karl Maximilian von Bauernfeind (1818–1894; see Bauernfeind prism)
 (born 2002), Austrian footballer
Kurt Bauernfeind (born 1940), Austrian artist
 (1889-1972), German evangelical theologian
Ricarda Bauernfeind (born 2000), German professional road cyclist
Tony D. Bauernfeind, United States Air Force lieutenant general and vice commander of the United States Special Operations Command
 (born 1941), freelance German painter and graphic artist
 (1935-2020), German opera director
 (born 1944), German journalist, feature author and director

See also
 Deutsches Namenlexikon, Gondrom,  2004.
 Lexikon der Familiennamen, Duden,  2008.

References

German-language surnames

de:Bauernfeind